Main's ground gecko (Lucasium maini ) is a species of gecko, a lizard in the family Diplodactylidae. The species is endemic to Australia.

Etymology
The specific name, maini, is in honor of Australian ecologist Albert "Bert" Russell Main.

Geographic range
L. maini is found in the southern part of the Australian state of Western Australia.

Habitat
The preferred habitats of L. maini are arid and semi-arid regions.

Reproduction
L. maini is oviparous.

References

Further reading
Cogger HG (2014). Reptiles and Amphibians of Australia, Seventh Edition. Clayton, Victoria, Australia: CSIRO Publishing. xxx + 1,033 pp. .
Kluge AG (1962). "A new species of gekkonid lizard, genus Diplodactylus Gray, from the southern interior of Western Australia". Western Australian Naturalist 8: 97–101. (Diplodactylus maini, new species).
Oliver, Paul M.; Hutchinson, Mark N.; Cooper, Steven J.B. (2007). "Phylogenetic relationships in the lizard genus Diplodactylus Gray and resurrection of Lucasium Wermuth (Gekkota, Diplodactylidae)". Australian Journal of Zoology 55 (3): 197–210. (Lucasium maini, new combination).
Wilson, Steve; Swan, Gerry (2013). A Complete Guide to Reptiles of Australia, Fourth Edition. Sydney: New Holland Publishers. 522 pp. .

Lucasium
Reptiles described in 1962
Taxa named by Arnold G. Kluge
Geckos of Australia